Naraoia is a genus of small to average size (about 2-4½ cm long) marine arthropods within the family Naraoiidae, that lived from the early Cambrian to the late Silurian period. The species are characterized by a large alimentary system and sideways oriented antennas.

Etymology 
The name is derived from Narao, the name of a group of small lakes in Cataract Brook canyon, above Hector on the Canadian Pacific Railway, British Columbia, Canada.

History of the classification 
When the fossil was first discovered in Canada's Burgess Shale, it was believed to be a crustacean, such was the difference between this and other trilobites. Its continuous shield hid most of its structure, interfering with proper classification. When Harry B. Whittington began dissecting some specimens (Naraoia was among the most populous of the Burgess Shale animals), he discovered that the legs (and gills) of the beasts were very similar, if not identical to those of trilobites, thus the current placement of Naraoia in class Trilobita. Misszhouia longicaudata was formerly considered a member of the genus Naraoia, originally known as N. longicaudata,  until separated in 1997.

Description 

Naraoia is almost flat (dorso-ventrally). The upper (or dorsal) side of the body consists of a non-calcified transversely oval or semi-circular headshield (cephalon), and a tailshield (pygidium) longer than the cephalon, without any body segments in between. The body is narrowed at the articulation between cephalon and pygidium. The long many-segmented antennas are directed sideways. There are no eyes. The gut has a relatively large diameter (14-18% of the width of the body), and next to four pairs of large digestive sacs (or caeca). The cephalon has branched diverticula occupying most of the cephalon (unlike in Misszhouia). Naraoia had appendages with two branches on a common basis, like Misszhouia and trilobites. At least the anterior trunk limbs have exopods with large, paddle-shaped distal lobes and short flattened side branches (setae) on the shaft. The endopod (known only in N. compacta) is composed of six podomeres.

Distribution 

Species of Naraoia are known from Canada, the United States, South China, and Australia, occurring in deposits ranging from the Lower Cambrian (Atdabanian) to the late Upper Silurian (Pridoli).

Ecology 
Sediments present in the gut of Naraoia suggest that it may have been a deposit feeder, eating large amounts of soil, like an earthworm. A very large, complex system of gut diverticula and a gut with great holding capacity indicate that the diet of Naraoia spinosa was low in nutrition. On the other hand, the morphology of the digestive system has also been interpreted as representing a predatory habit. The large, paddle-shaped distal lobes and short lamellar setae on the exopods, the implanting of the antennas to the side, and the angle of the cephalon with the pygidium of up to 90° with which many specimen are found, all agree with a life of burrowing.

Habitat 
All naraoiids were probably marine bottom dwellers.

Key to the species

References

External links 

 
The Smithsonian Intstitution's Naraoia page
 Genus †Naraoia - Hierarchy - The Taxonomicon

Nektaspida
Burgess Shale animals
Maotianshan shales fossils
Cambrian first appearances
Silurian extinctions
Wheeler Shale
Cambrian genus extinctions